Julio Moreno may refer to:

Julio Enrique Moreno (1879–1952), President of Ecuador
Julio Moreno (baseball) (1921–1987), Cuban-born right-handed pitcher
Julio Moreno (fencer) (1903–?), Chilean Olympic fencer
Julio Moreno (racing driver) (b. 1995), Ecuadorian racing driver
Julio César Moreno (born 1969), football coach
Julio Alberto Moreno (born 1958), Spanish retired footballer
Julio Cobos Moreno (born 1971), Spanish retired footballer